The 1995–96 Wisconsin Badgers men's basketball team represented the University of Wisconsin–Madison as a member of the Big Ten Conference during the 1995-96 NCAA Division I men's basketball season. It was head coach Dick Bennett's first season leading the Badgers. The team played its home games in Madison, Wisconsin at the UW Field House. Wisconsin finished the season 17–15, 8–10 in Big Ten play to finish in eighth place. The Badgers returned to the postseason by accepting a bid to the National Invitation Tournament, in which they beat Manhattan before falling to Illinois State in the second round.

Offseason 
Head coach Stan Van Gundy was fired on March 14, 1995, after one season that ended in a disappointing 13–14 record. The university announced the hiring of Dick Bennett as the 13th head coach in program history on March 31, 1995. Bennett had compiled a 361-188 (.658) record over 19 collegiate seasons at UW-Stevens Point and UW-Green Bay. Just prior to taking his "dream job" in Madison, Bennett had led UW-Green Bay to back-to-back NCAA Tournament appearances out of the Mid-Continent Conference and Midwestern Collegiate Conference.

Though 6-foot-7 Sam Okey had verbally committed to Van Gundy the previous year, the McDonald's All-American honored his commitment to play in-state for the Badgers. Okey was regarded across the country as a top 15 recruit despite hailing from tiny Cassville (pop. 1,025) in southwest Wisconsin.

Season summary 
Wisconsin started the Bennett-era with losses to a pair of top teams at the Maui Invitational, No. 3 Villanova and defending national champion UCLA (No. 4). In the midst of attrition, the Badgers still put together two separate four-game winning streaks during non-conference play, including a home defeat of Temple, 57–54, in overtime.

Incumbent point guard Darnell Hoskins started the first nine games, then transferred to his hometown University of Dayton in mid-December with the team's record at 5–4. Freshman Duany Duany suffered a season-ending injury to his right foot during practice the weekend of Thanksgiving and played only two games before taking a medical redshirt. Sophomore guard Sean Mason also suffered a season-ending right knee injury late in a win over No. 21 Michigan, 51–46. In that game, the Badgers held the Wolverines to three second-half field goals to make Bennett the first Wisconsin coach to win his Big Ten opener since Walter "Doc" Meanwell in 1912.

The benefits of Bennett's defense-first mentality were evident on other occasions. Wisconsin finished the season 10–1 when holding opponents to fewer than 60 points. The Badgers also held Michigan State scoreless for the first 9:38 of the teams' game in Madison.

Wisconsin managed to go above .500 in conference play (3–2) for the first time after consecutive wins with only seven scholarship players available. First the Badgers beat No. 11 Iowa, 80–71, on January 13, 1996, behind 23 points from Okey. It was the third of 12 sellouts the team took part in away from Maui. The next game, defense and Mosezell Peterson's 23–11 double-double spurred Wisconsin to the aforementioned 61–48 win over visiting Michigan State.

Beyond Okey's all-around brilliance, the emergence of freshman guard Hennssy Auriental eased the loss of Hoskins. After scoring in double figures in nine of 11 contests earlier in the year, Auriental made a game-tying three-pointer with under a minute left to help Wisconsin outlast Minnesota in overtime on January 24, 1996. The Montreal native also hit the game-winning jumper with seven seconds left at Illinois on February 3 to propel the Badgers to a 57–56 win.

On February 21, 1996, Northwestern completed a season sweep of the Badgers at the Field House when Geno Carlisle hit for 39 points in a game televised by ESPN. The loss was part of a 2–5 closing stretch that put an NCAA Tournament bid out of reach, despite a buzzer-beater by sophomore Sean Daugherty to beat No. 16 Penn State on March 6. Wisconsin settled for an NIT bid.

Postseason 
The team hosted a first-round NIT game against Manhattan at the UW Field House. The Badgers held the Jaspers without a field goal for the final 11:28 of the game to pull out a 55–42 win. However, Peterson, the team's second-leading scorer, dislocated his left knee cap in the victory, an injury that would ultimately end the sophomore's career.

Wisconsin hosted Illinois State in the second round. Despite 28 points from Okey, a career-high to that point, the Redbirds advanced with a convincing 77–62 win.

Awards 
Sam Okey
 Big Ten Freshman of the Year (coaches and media)
 All-Big Ten Honorable mention (media)

Roster

Schedule 

|-
!colspan=8 style=""| Regular Season

|-
!colspan=8 style=""|National Invitation Tournament

Player statistics

Records & trivia 
Okey became the first player in Big Ten history to lead his team in points, rebounds, assists and blocked shots over a full season.

References 

Wisconsin Badgers men's basketball seasons
Wisconsin
Wisconsin Badgers men's b
Wisconsin Badgers men's b